A litter is a stretcher or basket designed to be used where there are obstacles to movement or other hazards: for example, in confined spaces, on slopes, in wooded terrain. Typically it is shaped to accommodate an adult in a face up position and it is used in search and rescue operations. The person is strapped into the basket, making safe evacuation possible. The person generally is further protected by a cervical collar and sometimes a long spine board, so as to immobilize the person and prevent further injury.

A litter essentially is a stretcher with sides (or just a raised edge) and a removable head/torso cover. They are most notably remembered from Korea and Vietnam images of United States Air Force Pararescue airmen or more recent Coast Guard video clips of helicopters rescuing injured people from isolated areas. Some will also recall the images from the TV shows Emergency! and M*A*S*H of fixed stretchers on either side of medical evacuation helicopters.

One widely used style of litter is the Stokes basket.

Uses
After the person is secured in the litter, the litter may be wheeled, carried by hand, mounted on an ATV, towed behind skis, snowmobile, or horse, lifted or lowered on high angle ropes, or hoisted by helicopter.

Litters are used to rescue victims in confined spaces, such as inside a ship or a cave network. Litters used in surface water rescue are equipped with floats. Litters used in mountain rescue usually are equipped with a cover or other material to protect the person from falling rocks. Litters used in search and rescue often can be disassembled for easier carrying. Some litters can be mounted on a wheel.

Stokes basket

A Stokes basket, also called a Stokes stretcher or Stokes litter, is a metal wire or plastic litter widely used in search and rescue. Its key feature is that it can be disassembled for transport in backpacks or by pack horse.

Originally designed by Charles F. Stokes, these baskets have been notorious for spinning under the downdraft from the rotating helicopter blades.  Design improvements have included using multiple attachment points, separate hold-down cables, and powered extension hoists to help save more lives. Recently the U.S. Navy has used the Stokes basket to transport patients through narrow corridors and doorways.

History
During the United States Civil War, horse-mounted litters were used to transport wounded soldiers from battlefields. Rear Admiral Charles Francis Stokes, retired Surgeon General of the Navy from 1910 to 1924, devised the Stokes stretcher.

Gallery

See also 
 Battlefield medicine

References

External links

 Emergency Response Training, Inc.
 Successful Patient Packaging By Michael Dunn
 Stokes litter images
 

Medical transport devices
Rescue equipment